Eziran (also Romanized as Ezīrān; also known as Azrān) is a village in Baraan-e Jonubi Rural District, in the Central District of Isfahan County, Isfahan Province, Iran. At the 2006 census, its population was 1,170, in 279 families.

References 

Populated places in Isfahan County